A4E may refer to:
 A4e, formerly Action for Employment, a defunct British welfare-to-work company
 Airlines for Europe, a trade association of European airlines